Minister for the Union is a position created by the former prime minister of the United Kingdom Boris Johnson during his first ministry, to be held concurrently with the duties of prime minister. Johnson proposed the position during the 2019 Conservative Party leadership campaign. He was the first prime minister to adopt the title, and the post was retained by Johnson in his second ministry. The title was retained under Liz Truss and Rishi Sunak.

On 4 September 2019, the Government announced £10 million in funding to support the Prime Minister's work as Minister for the Union.

Responsibilities
Since September 2020, the responsibilities of the position have been: "As Minister for the Union, the Prime Minister works to ensure that all of government is acting on behalf of the entire United Kingdom: England, Northern Ireland, Scotland, and Wales." Before that point, the government website did not show any responsibilities associated with the position.

List of ministers

Reception
A spokesperson for Johnson stated that the office was intended to emphasise his commitment to strengthening the bond between the countries of the United Kingdom. In July 2019 the title was described as a "cynical rebranding" by Kirsty Blackman, deputy leader of the Scottish National Party in the House of Commons from 2017 to 2020, who advocates Scottish independence. During the COVID-19 pandemic in July 2020 Mark Drakeford, the First Minister of Wales and leader of Welsh Labour, drew attention to Johnson's lack of contact with the Welsh Government, saying "If you are minister for the union, speaking to the component parts of the union seems to me a sensible way of discharging those responsibilities."

Related proposals
Robert Hazell has suggested merging the offices of Secretary of State for Northern Ireland, Scotland and Wales into one Secretary of State for the Union, in a department into which Rodney Brazier has suggested adding a Minister of State for England with responsibility for English local government.

Notes

References

Union
Ministerial offices in the United Kingdom
British Prime Minister's Office
2019 establishments in the United Kingdom
Boris Johnson